Shirish Korde (born June 18, 1945), is a Ugandan composer of Indian ancestry. He is the Chair of the Music Department at the College of the Holy Cross (Worcester, MA) and has previously been on the faculty of the Berklee College of Music, the New England Conservatory, and Brown University.  Korde studied jazz and composition at the Berklee College of Music, analysis and composition at the New England Conservatory, and ethnomusicology at Brown University.

Works 
His works include: 
 Tenderness of Cranes, for solo flute, influenced by Japanese shakuhachi techniques 
 Time Grids, for amplified guitar and tape
 Constellations, for saxophone quartet
 Drowned Woman of the Sky, a song cycle based on poems by Pablo Neruda
 Nesting Cranes (2006), for solo flute and strings, premiered by Jennifer Gunn and the Chicago Symphony Orchestra under Ludovic Morlot
 Svara-Yantra (2005), a violin concerto premiered by the Polish National Radio Symphony Orchestra with soloist Joanna Kurkowicz, who also played the American premiere
Songs of Ecstasy (2008)
Zikhr: Songs of Longing (2009) for soprano, flute, string trio, harp, tabla and percussion, premiered by the Chameleon Arts Ensemble of Boston

Korde has composed five large-scale music-theatre works: 
 Chitra (2003), commissioned by Boston Musica Viva and premiered by that ensemble at a concert sponsored by the Celebrity Series of Boston
 Rasa (1999)
 Bhima's Journey
 The Separate Prison
 The Conquistadors
 Phoolan Devi: The Bandit Queen (2010), a multi-media opera based on the life of Phoolan Devi based on a libretto he authored with Lynn Kremer, who directed the premiere performances by Boston Musica Viva at Boston University's Tsai Performance Center.
Aède Of The Ocean And Land (based on Noor Inayat Khan's play of the same title) was premiered live with the Athens based ODC Ensemble and 20 performers from 4 different countries in September 2020

These works exhibit influences of Asian dramatic and musical forms, especially Balinese gamelan and shadow puppetry, Vedic chant, Tuva music from Central Asia, North Indian Tala, and shakuhachi music. Jazz elements and computer voice synthesis techniques are also incorporated into his music-theater works.  Korde also composed KA, for the Boston Musica Viva, a work for cello and voice (cellist Jan Müller-Szerwas and Deepti Navaratna, soprano) – Anusvara, Fifith Prism. He also composed a guitar concerto, Nada Ananda, released on CD featuring Simon Thacker and his ensemble. In 2021, Korde is working on a symphonic piece inspired by climate change, " Oceans Rising for the South Asian Symphony Orchestra."  He was also a resident composer at the 2021 Seal Bay Festival.  

He was described by Computer Music Journal as one of the few "contemporary composers who have been deeply touched by music of non-Western cultures, jazz, and computer technology and who has created a powerful and communicative compositional language."

Korde is the founder of Neuma Records.

Awards and grants 

 The National Flute Association
Composers Inc.
The Fuller Foundation
The Lef Foundation
The Fromm Foundation
The Massachusetts Council for the Arts
New England Foundation for the Arts
The Mellon Foundation
The Artists Foundation
Saint Botolph Club Foundation Award
Mass Cultural Council- 2021 Artist Fellowship Awards

References

External links
Neuma Records
Phoolan Devi: The Bandit Queen

1945 births
Living people
Berklee College of Music alumni
21st-century classical composers
20th-century classical composers
College of the Holy Cross faculty
American male musicians of Indian descent
American musicians of Indian descent
Berklee College of Music faculty
New England Conservatory faculty
Brown University faculty
Ugandan emigrants to the United States
American people of Marathi descent
Male classical composers
20th-century American male musicians
21st-century American male musicians
Indian artists
Indian American